Joe Barry (born Joseph Barrios; July 13, 1939 – August 31, 2004) was an American swamp pop singer active on the early rock and roll scene.

Biography
Barry was born in Cut Off, Louisiana. He started recording locally in 1958, and released two singles on Jin Records around 1960. In 1961, the second single he released for Jin, "I'm a Fool to Care" (originally a hit for Les Paul and Mary Ford), was picked up for national distribution by Mercury Records subsidiary Smash Records. The tune hit No. 15 on the U.S. Black Singles chart and No. 24 on the Billboard Hot 100. "I'm a Fool to Care" sold over one million copies by 1968, earning a gold record designation. The song also charted in the UK Singles Chart at No. 49. The follow-up single, "Teardrops in My Heart", also charted in the U.S. but did not reach the Top 40. Barry released several more singles on Smash and Nugget Records later in the 1960s, but left the music industry soon after. During his career in 1960 or 1961 Joe Barry also appeared on Dick Clark's American Bandstand.

Barry returned to music in 1977, releasing a full-length country album, and followed with a religious album in 1980. Health problems prevented him from continuing a career in music later in his life until 2003, when he released an album which took several years of overdubbing to complete due to his physical limitations. The album Been Down that Muddy Road was produced by Aaron Fuchs of Night Train International in New York City, along with Pershing Wells and Michael Vice of Houma, Louisiana.  The band Blue Eyed Soul Revue was used on all the tracks.

Barry died in his birthplace of Cut Off, Louisiana, on August 31, 2004, at age 65.

Discography
Joe Barry (ABC Records/Dot Records, 1977)
Sweet Rose of Sharon (1980)
I'm a Fool to Care: The Complete Recordings 1958–1977 (compilation) (Night Train Records, 1999)
Been Down that Muddy Road (Night Train, 2003)

References

1939 births
2004 deaths
Musicians from Louisiana
Swamp pop music
Smash Records artists
20th-century American musicians
People from Cut Off, Louisiana